In computer science, query throughput (QthD) is a measurement used to determine the performance of a database system. The throughput metric is a classical throughput measure characterizing the ability of the system to support a multi-user workload in a balanced way.

Background

In the background there is an update stream that runs a series of insert/delete operations (one pair for each query user). The choice of the number of users is at the discretion of the test sponsor.

The throughput metric is computed as the total amount of work (S×17), converted to hours from seconds (3600 seconds per hour), scaled by the database volume (SF) and divided by the total elapsed time (Ts) required between the first query starting and the last query or update function completing.

Therefore, the complete formulation is:

References

Computer performance
Temporal rates